Mycothyridium is a genus of fungi in the class Dothideomycetes. The relationship of this taxon to other taxa within the class is unknown (incertae sedis).

Species 

Mycothyridium adeanum
Mycothyridium ahmadii
Mycothyridium americanum
Mycothyridium andicola
Mycothyridium antiquum
Mycothyridium argentinense
Mycothyridium boehmeriae
Mycothyridium cacheutense
Mycothyridium ceanothi
Mycothyridium cingulatum
Mycothyridium coffeicola
Mycothyridium concinnum
Mycothyridium deviatum
Mycothyridium flavum
Mycothyridium floridanum
Mycothyridium fusisporum
Mycothyridium lividum
Mycothyridium macedonicum
Mycothyridium marylandicum
Mycothyridium nobile
Mycothyridium pakistani
Mycothyridium pallidum
Mycothyridium personatum
Mycothyridium platense
Mycothyridium pulchellum
Mycothyridium quimelense
Mycothyridium rechingeri
Mycothyridium rousselianum
Mycothyridium sambuci
Mycothyridium semnanense
Mycothyridium speciosum
Mycothyridium stilbostomum
Mycothyridium syringae
Mycothyridium tuberculatum
Mycothyridium valparadisiacum
Mycothyridium vestitum
Mycothyridium vitis
Mycothyridium yerbae

See also 
 List of Dothideomycetes genera incertae sedis

References

External links 
 Mycothyridium at Index Fungorum

Dothideomycetes enigmatic taxa
Dothideomycetes genera